The UT Martin Skyhawks (also known as Tennessee–Martin Skyhawks) are the intercollegiate athletic teams that represent the University of Tennessee at Martin (UTM) in Martin, Tennessee, United States. The Skyhawks athletic program is a member of the Ohio Valley Conference (OVC) and competes at the NCAA Division I level including the Football Championship Subdivision. The UTM mascot is Captain Skyhawk. The school colors are navy and orange.

Sports sponsored
A member of the Ohio Valley Conference, the University of Tennessee at Martin sponsors teams in five men's, nine women's, and one co-ed NCAA sanctioned sports.

National championships

Individual

Athletic facilities
Source:

Baseball: Skyhawk Baseball Field
Basketball: Kathleen and Tom Elam Center
Beach Volleyball: Skyhawk Beach Volleyball Complex
Equestrian: Ned McWherter Agricultural Complex
Football: Hardy M. Graham Stadium & Bob Carroll Football Building
Golf: Rhodes Golf Center & Jackson Country Club (Jackson, TN)
Rifle: Skyhawk Rifle Range
Soccer: Skyhawk Soccer Field
Softball: Bettye Giles Softball Field
Tennis: Skyhawk Tennis Complex
Volleyball: Skyhawk Fieldhouse
Rodeo: Ned McWherter Agricultural Complex

Highlights

Basketball
In 2011, the Skyhawk women's basketball team qualified for the NCAA tournament for the first time. In 2011, 2012 and 2013, women's basketball made consecutive appearances in the national tournament.

Tennis
The Skyhawk women’s tennis team won its fifth Ohio Valley Conference championship in 2011. Coach Dennis Taylor also earned his sixth OVC Coach of the Year award.

In fall 1997, a women's club team was formed. The inaugural season of an NCAA Division 1 AA team was recognized in fall 1998. This team was coached by a former OPD coach, Dr. Ruth Holden.

Soccer
The Skyhawk soccer team claimed its first-ever Ohio Valley Conference Tournament championship in fall 2011 and made its first appearance in the NCAA women’s soccer tournament. The team repeated its Ohio Valley Conference Tournament championship victory in 2012 with the same enthusiasm. In 2013 UT Martin hosted the Ohio Valley Conference Tournament Championship at Skyhawk field for the first time in UT Martin soccer history.

Rodeo
The UT Martin rodeo team, the only collegiate rodeo team in Tennessee, is a member of the National Intercollegiate Rodeo Association. Recent successes include Jeff Askey’s winning the bull-riding national championship in 2010, the women’s rodeo team capturing the Ozark Region title in spring 2011, and the men’s team finishing second in the region. Both teams advanced in June 2011 to the College National Finals Rodeo. The UT Martin men's rodeo team won the 2014 College National Finals Rodeo Men's National Championship, becoming the first team east of the Mississippi River to win a national title in rodeo.

References

External links